The thick-billed raven (Corvus crassirostris), a corvid from the Horn of Africa, shares with the common raven the distinction of being the largest bird in the corvid family, and indeed the largest of  the passerines. Its size is about the same as the largest subspecies of common raven (i.e. those from the Himalayas and Greenland/Canadian Northwest Atlantic) but some common raven subspecies are rather smaller and, going on average weights, the thick-billed raven is likely the heaviest extant passerine. The thick-billed raven is about 25% heavier on average than the Australasian superb lyrebird, which is sometimes erroneously titled the largest passerine.

It has a very large bill that is laterally compressed and is deeply curved in profile giving the bird a very distinctive appearance. This raven has very short feathers on the head, throat and neck. The throat and upper breast have an oily brown gloss, while the rest of the bird is glossy black except for a distinctive white patch of feathers on the nape and onto the neck.

Distribution and habitat
Its range covers Eritrea, Somalia and Ethiopia; its habitat includes mountains and high plateau between elevations of 1,500 to 3,400 metres. It is one of several avian species endemic to northeastern tropical Africa.

Behaviour

Diet
The thick-billed raven is omnivorous, feeding on grubs, beetle larvae from animal dung, carrion, scraps of meat and human food. It has been seen taking standing wheat. When seeking food from dung, it has been seen using a distinct scything movement to scatter the dung and extract the grubs.

Nesting
It nests in trees and on cliffs, apparently building a stick nest like the similar and much more widely distributed and studied white-necked raven. It lays three to five eggs. In one case, thick-billed ravens were observed to vigorously displace predatory Verreaux's eagle owls from their nest area.

Voice
Its calls include a harsh nasal croak, a low wheezy croak, a "raven-raven", and sometimes a "dink, dink, dink" sound. Like many corvids, the thick-billed raven is capable of vocal mimicry; however, this behavior is rare in the wild, and is normally recorded only in captivity.

References

External links

 Thick-billed Raven videos, photos & sounds on the Macaulay Library

thick-billed raven
thick-billed raven
Birds of the Horn of Africa
thick-billed raven